Veronika Khek Kubařová (born 1 June 1987 in Rakovník) is a Czech actress. In December 2019 Khek Kubařová won the tenth season of StarDance with her professional partner Dominik Vodička.

Selected filmography

Films 
 Rafťáci (2006)
 Ženy v pokušení (2010)
 Lidice (2011)
 10 pravidel jak sbalit holku (2014)
 Bezva ženská na krku (2016)
 Ženy v běhu (2019)
 Modelář (2020)
 Jedině Tereza (2021)
 Tajemství staré bambitky 2 (2022) 
 Vyšehrad: Fylm (2022)
 Přání k narozeninám (2022)

TV series 
 Mazalové (2014)
 Všechny moje lásky (2015)
 Na vodě (2016)
 Specialisté (2017)
 Zkáza Dejvického divadla (2019)

References

External links
 
 Biography on csfd.cz
 Instagram profile

1987 births
Living people
Czech film actresses
21st-century Czech actresses
Czech stage actresses
Czech television actresses
People from Rakovník
Prague Conservatory alumni
Czech voice actresses